The Yugoslavian Women's Volleyball Cup  was a women's volleyball cup held between the year 1959 and 1991 in Yugoslavia managed by the Yugoslavian Socialist Republic Volleyball Federation.

Competition history 
The competition Started in 1959 and 6 season played until 1964 when the competition stopped for almost 8 years and resumed again in 1971 and finally reached its last season 1991 due to the dissolution of the state of Yugoslavia.

Winners list

References

External links
  Official Website  

Volleyball in Yugoslavia